In Greek mythology, Laodice (/leɪˈɒdəˌsi/; Ancient Greek: Λαοδίκη, [la.odíkɛː]; "people-justice") may refer to the following figures:

Laodice, the nymph-consort of Phoroneus and possible mother of his children.
Laodice, one of the Hyperborean maidens. Together with her sister, Hyperoche, Laodice was buried after her death on the temple grounds of Apollo , where their grave was worshiped by the residents.
Laodice, daughter of Aloeus, wife of Aeolus and mother of Salmoneus and Cretheus.
Laodice, daughter of King Priam and a princess of Troy
 Laodice, daughter of Agamemnon and Clytaemnestra, sometimes conflated with Electra.
 Laodice, daughter of King Cinyras of Cyprus and Metharme. She was the wife of Elatus and by him mother of Stymphalus and Pereus, and possibly of Ischys, Cyllen and Aepytus too.
 Laodice, descendant of Agapenor, who was known for having sent to Tegea a robe as a gift to Athena Alea, and to have built a temple of Aphrodite Paphia in Tegea.
 Laodice or Laodamia, alternate name for Iphthime, daughter of Icarius of Sparta and Asterodia, daughter of Eurypylus. She was the sister of Amasichus, Phalereus, Thoon, Pheremmelias and Perilaos.
 Laodice, daughter of Iphis and mother of Capaneus.
 Laodice, a golden-haired lover of Poseidon.

Notes

References 

 https://en.wikipedia.org/wiki/User:Markx121993/sandbox?action=edit
Homer, The Iliad with an English Translation by A.T. Murray, Ph.D. in two volumes. Cambridge, MA., Harvard University Press; London, William Heinemann, Ltd. 1924. . Online version at the Perseus Digital Library.
Homer, Homeri Opera in five volumes. Oxford, Oxford University Press. 1920. . Greek text available at the Perseus Digital Library.
 Pausanias, Description of Greece with an English Translation by W.H.S. Jones, Litt.D., and H.A. Ormerod, M.A., in 4 Volumes. Cambridge, MA, Harvard University Press; London, William Heinemann Ltd. 1918. . Online version at the Perseus Digital Library
Pausanias, Graeciae Descriptio. 3 vols. Leipzig, Teubner. 1903.  Greek text available at the Perseus Digital Library.
 Publius Ovidius Naso, The Epistles of Ovid. London. J. Nunn, Great-Queen-Street; R. Priestly, 143, High-Holborn; R. Lea, Greek-Street, Soho; and J. Rodwell, New-Bond-Street. 1813. Online version at the Perseus Digital Library.

Princesses in Greek mythology
Nymphs
Children of Agamemnon
Women of Poseidon
Mortal parents of demigods in classical mythology
Laconian characters in Greek mythology